Elections to Chorley Borough Council were held on 6 May 1999.  One third of the council was up for election and the Labour party kept overall control of the council.

After the election, the composition of the council was:

Election result

Ward results

Adlington

Chorley East

Chorley North East

Chorley South East

Chorley South West

Chorley West

Clayton-le-Woods East

Clayton-le-Woods West and Cuerden

Coppull North

Coppull South

Eccleston and Heskin ward

Euxton North

Euxton South

Lostock ward

Whittle-le-Woods

Withnell

References
1999 Chorley election results
Smiles all round after election

1999 English local elections
1999
1990s in Lancashire